Paramilitary police could mean any of the following:

 a gendarmerie
 a constabulary
 a police tactical unit, such as a SWAT
 an auxiliary
 non-government paramilitary forces taking on a policing role, such as paramilitary punishment attacks in Northern Ireland

police
Law enforcement agencies
Military police